Khoseda-Khardsky, sometimes written as Khoseda-Khard, Hoseda-Hardsky, or Hoseda-Hard is a rural locality in Zapolyarny District, Nenets Autonomous Okrug, Russia. Its center is the village (selo) of Kharuta. Population:

Transportation
Khoseda-Khardsky is served by the Kharuta Airport.

Climate

Khoseda-Khardsky has a subarctic climate (Köppen climate classification Dfc). Precipitation is moderate, and is somewhat higher from July to October than at other times of the year.

References

Rural localities in Nenets Autonomous Okrug